James Shields (21 November 1918 – 20 June 1978) was a Scottish psychiatric geneticist and twin researcher. In the 1960s, he worked with Irving Gottesman on a twin study of schizophrenia at the Medical Research Council Psychiatric Genetics Unit at Maudsley Hospital in London, England. This study, known as the Maudsley twin study, is now considered a landmark in the field. He had previously begun working for Eliot Slater at Maudsley after serving in the United Kingdom's Royal Artillery during World War II. He was a fellow of the Eugenics Society and the International Society for Twin Studies. After Shields died in 1978, Gottesman founded the annual James Shields Award for Lifetime Contributions to Twin Research in his honor.

References

Scottish psychiatrists
1918 births
1978 deaths
Psychiatric geneticists
Scottish geneticists
Scientists from Edinburgh
Alumni of Merton College, Oxford
Alumni of the London School of Economics
20th-century British zoologists
British Army personnel of World War II
Royal Artillery personnel
Behavior geneticists
Military personnel from Edinburgh